Blast is a 2004 action film directed by Anthony Hickox and starring Eddie Griffin, Vinnie Jones, Breckin Meyer, and Vivica A. Fox. It was written by Steven E. de Souza. The film is a remake of the German television film Operation Noah (1998).

Plot
A terrorist, Michael Kittredge (Vinnie Jones), posing as an environmentalist protester leads a team of highly skilled mercenaries to take control of an oil rig off the coast of California, intending to detonate an electromagnetic bomb over the United States, striking a sort of "new Pearl Harbor" attack on behalf of enemies to the nation. What Kittredge didn't count on is a tugboat captain, Lamont Dixon (Eddie Griffin), who survives an attack on his ship, and is soon recruited by an FBI agent (Vivica A. Fox) to infiltrate the oil rig and procure information about their plans, and if possible, stop them. In the process, Dixon meets an eager computer expert (Breckin Meyer) aboard the oil rig who helps Dixon even as he gets on his nerves and Lamont suspects he can't really trust him.

Cast
 Eddie Griffin as Lamont Dixon
 Breckin Meyer as Jamal 
 Vivica A. Fox as Agent Reed
 Vinnie Jones as Michael Kittridge
 Shaggy as Mace
 Tiny Lister as Smiley
 Nadine Velazquez as Luna
 Hannes Jaenicke as CEO Heller
Jordan Preaster as Andrew Cardway

References

External links 
 
 

2004 films
2004 action thriller films
Films directed by Anthony Hickox
Films with screenplays by Steven E. de Souza
2000s English-language films
English-language German films
English-language South African films
American remakes of German films